Ectoblemma is a monotypic moth genus of the family Noctuidae. Its only species, Ectoblemma rosella, is found in Japan. Both the genus and the species were first described by Shigero Sugi in 1982.

References

Acontiinae
Monotypic moth genera